Blizhnepodgorsky is a rural locality (a khutor) in Nizhnechirskoye Rural Settlement, Surovikinsky District, Volgograd Oblast, Russia. The population was 120 as of 2010.

Geography 
Blizhnepodgorsky is located 37 km southeast of Surovikino (the district's administrative centre) by road. Blizhnemelnichny is the nearest rural locality.

References 

Rural localities in Surovikinsky District